Allyson Dale is a Zimbabwean international lawn bowler.

Bowls career
Dale was selected as part of the five woman team by Zimbabwe for the 2020 World Outdoor Bowls Championship

She won a fours bronze medal (with Melanie James, Heather Singleton and Kerry Craven), at the 2019 Atlantic Bowls Championships.

References

Zimbabwean female bowls players
Living people
Year of birth missing (living people)